Falsischnolea pallidipennis is a species of beetle in the family Cerambycidae. It was described by Louis Alexandre Auguste Chevrolat in 1861.

References

Apomecynini
Beetles described in 1861